Mississauga Fire and Emergency Services (MFES) provides fire protection, technical rescue services, hazardous materials response, and first responder emergency medical assistance to the city of Mississauga, Ontario, Canada.

The Fire Service was established in 1968 and formed from local departments (Cooksville, Lakeview, Malton, Meadowvale) that existed prior to the creation of Mississauga, Ontario. The Port Credit Fire Department and Streetsville Fire Departments were added upon the amalgamation of those communities with Mississauga in 1974. MFES was mainly made up of the Toronto Township Volunteer Fire Department, itself created from volunteer units in the 1870s. By 1975, Mississauga's fire service was a full-time service.

Mississauga Fire co-ordinates with Toronto Fire Services, Brampton Fire and Emergency Services, and Peel Regional Paramedic Services for additional help and practicing emergency disaster exercises. In 2017, MFES responded to over 34,000 emergency calls.

Operations

Fire stations and apparatus
Mississauga, Brampton, and Caledon underwent a region-wide renumbering of stations and apparatus in the 1990s. Each station is assigned a 3 digit number and each apparatus is given an alpha-numeric callsign corresponding with the station number. The alphabetic prefix identifies the type of apparatus, the first numerical digit identifies the municipality, and the remaining two numerical digits identify the station. The municipality identifiers are '1' for Mississauga, '2' for Brampton, and '3' for Caledon.

For example, Station 101 would be Mississauga's no. 1 station and P101 would be a pumper assigned to it, and so on. Spare apparatus (for Mississauga and Brampton) would be numbered with a 5 as the second numerical digit in the number (P150, S151, A152, etc.). In January 2020, as part of an apparatus redeployment plan, a second Pumper Company was organized and assigned to Station 101. Since the department had not previously run two Pumper Companies out of the same station, a numbering system for duplicate companies had not been utilized. To distinguish the second pumper from P101, it was given the callsign P131. 

As of November 2022, MFES currently operates 21 fire stations and the following apparatus:

Apparatus glossary
 Pumper - Standard pumper truck. Pumpers are equipped with firefighting gear as well as basic rescue tools and other equipment
 Squad - Rescue pumper truck. Squads are equipped with firefighting gear as well as a variety of rescue and extrication tools and equipment.
 Aerial - Rear-mounted aerial ladder or platform quint. Aerials have firefighting tools and specialized gear for certain emergency situations.
 Car - Vehicle for District Chiefs and Platoon Chiefs and other miscellaneous department officials. Other Car Vehicles are assigned to the Mechanical Division and Training Division and have command gear and other equipment.
 Air & Light - Air & light support vehicle. This vehicle is equipped with an air refill system for refilling air cylinders and this unit also carries electrical items and other specialized equipment.
 Tanker - Pumper-tanker / water tender. This vehicle carries water for fighting fires and it also has support equipment for other situations.
 Haz-Mat - Hazardous Materials Incident Team. This unit carries Haz-Mat (Hazardous Materials) response equipment and helps provide support for first responders who are entering into dangerous environments
 Tech Rescue - Technical Rescue vehicle. This vehicle is a large box on wheels and carries specialized equipment for all kinds of rescue situations. It carries various power tools and specialized rescue gear for rescues in the categories of Vehicle Rescue and Extrication, Building Collapse, Trench Rescues, etc.
 Special Operations - Technical Rescue / Haz-Mat support vehicle. This vehicle has equipment for supporting emergency personnel on specialized emergency incidents. This is a support vehicle that responds to all kinds of emergencies for support.
 Command Post - Incident command truck. This vehicle responds to emergencies to provide communications and control with either police personnel, fire personnel or Emergency Medical Services personnel or all other personnel communicating with dispatchers or members in the police, fire and emergency medical services.
 Rehab - Firefighter medical support vehicle. This vehicle carries items that help firefighters stay healthy and refreshed during large scale incidents or training events. Items used for this purpose include water, granola bars, tents, etc.

Petro Canada Lubricants

Petro Canada has its own in-house fire equipment (emergency response team) at its lubricants facility in Mississauga. For major fires or other situations, Mississauga Fire would be asked to assist as primary responders.

Notable  incidents
 Air Canada Flight 189 disaster (1978)
 Mississauga train derailment (1979)
 Air France Flight 358 runway accident (2005)
 Mississauga Restaurant Bombing (2018)

Members

As of 2006 MFES has 700 firefighters and personnel. The firefighters are represented by Local 1212 of IAFF.

See also
 Peel Regional Paramedic Services

References

External links
 Mississauga Fire and Emergency Services
 Mississauga Fire Fighters Association
 Mississauga Fire Live Audio Feed

Fire departments in Ontario
Fire and Emergency Services, Mississauga
Regional Municipality of Peel